The Kranenbach is an orographically right-hand tributary of the Schwalm in the Lower Rhine county of Viersen.

The stream has a length of just under 9.5 kilometres and empties into the Schwalm by the mill of Borner Mühle at a height of about .. The Kranenbach picks up the waters of the Haversloher Bach (1.5 kilometres long), the Heidweiher Bach (1.5 kilometres long), the Vogelsrather Bach (1.7 kilometres long), the Schageher Bach (1.4 kilometres long) and the Berggraben which has a length of 2.3 kilometres.

The Kranenbach was canalized in the years 1925/26. Its care and maintenance is the responsibility of the Schwalmverband, which has its head office in Brüggen.

Mills 
There are a number of former water mills on the Kranenbach:

 Hausermühle, Schwalmtal, Waldniel
 Schierer Mühle, Schier
 Pletschmühle, Amern
 Hüttermühle, Amern

References 

Viersen (district)
Rivers of North Rhine-Westphalia
Rivers of Germany